The Appropriation Acts (Repeal) Act, 2016 is an Act of the Parliament of India that repealed 758 Appropriation Acts that were now obsolete. An Appropriation Act is an Act that authorizes the Government of India to withdraw funds from the Consolidated Fund of India to meet expenses for a fiscal year. The Act was among a series repealing acts tabled by the Narendra Modi administration aimed at repealing obsolete laws.

Background and legislative history
Prime Minister Narendra Modi advocated the repeal of old laws during his 2014 general election campaign. At the 2015 Economic Times Global Business Summit, Modi stated, "Our country suffers from an excess of old and unnecessary laws which obstruct people and businesses. We began the exercise of identifying unnecessary laws and repealing them. 1,877 Central laws have been identified for repeal."

A bill to repeal 758 Appropriation Acts was approved by the Union Cabinet on 20 March 2015. The Appropriation Acts (Repeal) Bill, 2015 was introduced in the Lok Sabha on 24 April 2015 by then Minister of Law and Justice, D.V. Sadananda Gowda. The Bill sought to repeal 758 Appropriation Acts including 111 state appropriation acts enacted by Parliament between 1950 and 1976, and Railway Appropriation Acts enacted during 1950–2012. The bill was passed by the Lok Sabha on 11 May 2015. The Select Committee of the Rajya Sabha proposed including an automatic repeal clause in future Appropriation Acts. The government confirmed that such a clause would be included in the Appropriation Act, 2016. The Bill was passed by the Rajya Sabha on 27 April 2016. The bill received assent from then President Pranab Mukherjee on 6 May 2016, and was notified in The Gazette of India on 9 May 2016.

Repealed Acts
The 758 Appropriation Acts included in the bill's Schedule were completely repealed.

References

Acts of the Parliament of India 2016